The Charles Darwin Trust is a British educational charity. 
The trust was founded in 1999 by Stephen Keynes.
The trust was part of a campaign with other organizations to back the bid to make Down House a World Heritage Site.

People 
Trustees of the trust are Stephen Keynes OBE FLS (Chairman), Francis Carnwath CBE (Treasurer), Dr Claire Barlow (appointed 2006), Prof. Sir Patrick Bateson FRS, Sir Matthew Farrer GCVO, Timothy Hornsby CBE, Prof. J. Stephen Jones, Randal Keynes OBE FLS, Prof. Keith Stewart Thomson and Dr Patrick Zutshi.

Previous trustees include Janet Browne (resigned 2006), Bernard Bulkin (resigned 2006), Angela Huxley (resigned 2006)

The Science Advisory Council consists of Sir Paul Nurse FRS, Prof. Lord Rees of Ludlow PRS, Dr James Watson KBE ForMemRS, Prof. E.O. Wilson ForMemRS.

David Kohn is Senior Research Fellow.  Karen Goldie-Morrison is Director.

References

External links
 Official website

Educational charities based in the United Kingdom